Michael John Wooldridge (born 26 August 1966) is a professor of computer science at the University of Oxford. His main research interests is in multi-agent systems, and in particular, in the computational theory aspects of rational action in systems composed of multiple self-interested agents. His work is characterised by the use of techniques from computational logic, game theory, and social choice theory.

Education 
Wooldridge was educated at the University of Manchester Institute of Science and Technology (UMIST) where he was awarded a PhD in 1991.

Career and research
Wooldridge was appointed a lecturer in Computer Science at the Manchester Metropolitan University in 1992. In 1996, he moved to London, where he became senior lecturer at Queen Mary and Westfield College in 1998. His appointment as full professor in the Department of Computer Science at the University of Liverpool followed in 1999. In Liverpool he served as head of department from 2001 to 2005 and as head of the School of Electrical Engineering, Electronics, and Computer Science from 2008 to 2011. In 2012 the European Research Council awarded him a five-year ERC Advanced Grant for the project Reasoning about Computational Economies (RACE). In the same year he left Liverpool to become professor of computer science at the University of Oxford, and served as head of the Department of Computer Science from 2014 - 2018. In Oxford he is a senior research fellow of Hertford College, Oxford.

Michael Wooldridge is author of more than 300 academic publications.

Editorial service 
	2003–2009 co-editor-in-chief of the Journal Autonomous Agents and Multi-Agent Systems
	2006–2009 associate editor of the Journal of Artificial Intelligence Research (JAIR) 
	2009–2012 associate editor of the Journal of Artificial Intelligence Research (JAIR)  
	
Other editorships: Journal of Applied Logic, Journal of Logic and Computation, Journal of Applied Artificial Intelligence, and Computational Intelligence.

Awards and honors 
He is a Fellow of the Association for the Advancement of Artificial Intelligence (AAAI), a European Coordinating Committee for Artificial Intelligence (ECCAI) Fellow, a Society for the Study of Artificial Intelligence and the Simulation of Behaviour (AISB) Fellow, and a British Computer Society (BCS) Fellow. In 2015, he was made Association for Computing Machinery (ACM) Fellow for his contributions to multi-agent systems and the formalisation of rational action in multi-agent environments.
 2021 AAAI/EAAI Outstanding Educator Award
 2020 BCS Lovelace Medal 
 2015 Elected an Association for Computing Machinery (ACM) Fellow. For contributions to multi-agent systems and the formalisation of rational action in multi-agent environments.
 2012–17 ERC Advanced Investigator Grant "Reasoning about Computational Economies (RACE)" (5-year €2m award)
 2009 British Society for the Study of Artificial Intelligence and Simulation of Behaviour (SSAISB) Fellow
 2008 American Association for Artificial Intelligence (AAAI) Fellow
 2008 Influential Paper Award, Special Recognition from the International Foundation for Autonomous Agents and Multi-Agent Systems, for the paper Intelligent Agents: Theory and Practice
 2007 European Association for Artificial Intelligence (ECCAI) Fellow
 2006 ACM/SIGART Autonomous Agents Research Award.  For significant and sustained contributions to the research on autonomous agents and multi agent systems. In particular, Dr. Wooldridge has made seminal contributions to the logical foundations of multi-agent systems, especially to formal theories of co-operation, teamwork and communication, computational complexity in multi-agent systems, and agent-oriented software engineering.

Personal life 
Michael Wooldridge was born in Wakefield (West Yorkshire, United Kingdom) in 1966 as the second son to John and Jean Wooldridge. He is married with two children.

Publications
 
 
 
 
 
 
 

Wooldridge, Michael (19 January 2020). A Brief History of Artificial Intelligence: What It Is, Where We Are, and Where We Are Going. New York: Flatiron Books. .

References

Artificial intelligence researchers
Alumni of the University of Manchester Institute of Science and Technology
Academics of Manchester Metropolitan University
Academics of Queen Mary University of London
Fellows of Hertford College, Oxford
Academics of the University of Liverpool
British computer scientists
People from Wakefield
Fellows of the Association for the Advancement of Artificial Intelligence
Fellows of the Association for Computing Machinery
Fellows of the British Computer Society
1966 births
Living people
Fellows of the SSAISB
Fellows of the European Association for Artificial Intelligence